Wat Zom Khum (also spelt Wat Jong Kham) is a 15th-century Buddhist temple in Kengtung, Shan State, Myanmar (Burma).

References 

Buddhist temples in Myanmar
Buildings and structures in Shan State
15th-century Buddhist temples
Religious buildings and structures completed in the 1400s